The 2002 Skate America was the first event of six in the 2002–03 ISU Grand Prix of Figure Skating, a senior-level international invitational competition series. It was held at the Spokane Arena in Spokane, Washington on October 23–27. Medals were awarded in the disciplines of men's singles, ladies' singles, pair skating, and ice dancing. Skaters earned points toward qualifying for the 2002–03 Grand Prix Final. The compulsory dance was the Austrian Waltz.

Results

Men
Reigning Olympic champion Alexei Yagudin withdrew with injury after the short program in what became the final competition of his amateur career. Brian Joubert went on to win the event for his first international title.

Ladies
Yukari Nakano and Ludmila Nelidina both landed a triple Axel in their free skating, together becoming the first female skaters to perform the jump in international competition since Midori Ito landed it at the 1992 Winter Olympics. Nakano landed it first and Nelidina, who skated after her, also performed it successfully.

Pairs

Ice dancing

References

External links
 2002 Smart Ones Skate America

Skate America, 2002
Skate America